Sheikh Ali Al-Khalifa Al-Sabah (born October 22, 1945) is a Kuwaiti ruling family member and former minister of oil and finance.

References 

1945 births
Living people